Nicoleta Alina Dobrin (former Păcuraru; born 1 August 1976) is a Romanian handball player. She competed in the women's tournament at the 2000 Summer Olympics.

References

1976 births
Living people
Romanian female handball players
Olympic handball players of Romania
Handball players at the 2000 Summer Olympics
Sportspeople from Bucharest